Pseudodaphnella infrasulcata is a species of sea snail, a marine gastropod mollusk in the family Raphitomidae.

Description
The length of the shell varies between 6 mm and 10 mm.

The shell is slightly angulated above, longitudinally distantly ribbed, latticed with narrow raised revolving ridges and cavernously grooved near the base. The color of the shell is chestnut, lighter on the ridges.

Distribution
This marine species occurs off the Fiji Islands.

References

 Garrett, A., 1873. Descriptions of new species of marine shells inhabiting the South Sea Islands.
 Hervier, J., 1897. Description d'espèces nouvelles de mollusques provenant de l'archipel de la Nouvelle-Calédonie (suite). Journal de Conchyliologie 44"1896": 138-151

External links
 
 Kilburn, R. N. (2009). Genus Kermia (Mollusca: Gastropoda: Conoidea: Conidae: Raphitominae) in South African Waters, with Observations on the Identities of Related Extralimital Species. African Invertebrates. 50(2): 217-236
 Syntype at MNHN, Paris

infrasulcata
Gastropods described in 1873